Caylus (Languedocien: Cailutz) is a commune in the Tarn-et-Garonne department in the Occitanie region in southern France. Its inhabitants are called Caylusiens and Caylusiennes.

City
Caylus is famous for a castle built before 1176, and was owned by Raymond V of Toulouse at the time. It was taken by Simon de Montfort in 1211, before moving into the royal domain in 1270. In 1562, the city was sacked by the troops Calvinists of Symphorien Durfort, lord of Duras. In 1622, Louis XIII established headquarters here during the siege of Saint-Antonin.

See also
Communes of the Tarn-et-Garonne department

References

Communes of Tarn-et-Garonne
Quercy